Briley Casanova (born November 17, 1994) is an American gymnast. She is a former International Elite who competed for the Michigan Wolverines women's gymnastics team. Casanova shared the Unsung Hero award with Talia Chiarelli in 2015. Before Michigan, Casanova competed in the 2009 International Junior Gymnastics Competition in Japan.

Achievements
Full scholarship to the University of Michigan
 2009 Junior Japan International: 3rd AA, 3rd UB
 2009 Jr. USAG National Team Member
 2008 Jr. USAG National Team Member

References

External links
 Briley Casanova's Official Website

American female artistic gymnasts
Living people
1994 births
Michigan Wolverines women's gymnasts
U.S. women's national team gymnasts
Gymnasts from Texas